Yu Pan is an engineer and entrepreneur mentioned in one source as one of the original six people who started PayPal and the first employee at YouTube, as an early software engineer.  He is a former Google employee and also a co-founder of Kiwi Crate, Inc.

Pan received a BS in computer science from the University of Illinois at Urbana–Champaign. In 2007, Pan gained an Illinois Mathematics and Science Academy Alumni Award, and he is listed as a notable alumnus alongside technology entrepreneurs Steve Chen, Ramez Naam, Russel Simmons, and Sam Yagan.

Pan currently works as an R&D Engineer at Origin Protocol.

References

External links
IMSA Board of Trustees Alumni Award Recipients
YouTube millionaires: from wealthy backers to receptionist
Hogwarts for Hackers: Inside the science and tech school of tomorrow
PayPal Slide Show published by Max Levchin

Living people
American computer businesspeople
American technology company founders
PayPal people
Grainger College of Engineering alumni
Year of birth missing (living people)
American people of Chinese descent
Chinese computer businesspeople